No. 132 Helicopter Flight (Hovering Hawks) is a Forward Air Control Helicopter squadron and is equipped with HAL Cheetah and based at Udhampur Air Force Station.

History

Assignments

Aircraft
HAL Cheetah

References

132